The Kreka Coal Mine is a coal mine located in the Tuzla Canton. The mine has coal reserves amounting to 1.12 billion tonnes of lignite, one of the largest coal reserves in Europe and the world. The mine has an annual production capacity of 2.95 million tonnes of coal.

See also 
Dobrnja-Jug mine disaster

References 

Coal mines in Bosnia and Herzegovina
Tuzla